The red-necked stint (Calidris ruficollis) is a small migratory wader. The genus name is from Ancient Greek kalidris or skalidris, a term used by Aristotle for some grey-coloured waterside birds. The specific ruficollis is from Latin rufus, "red" and collum, "neck".

Description
These birds are among the smallest of waders, very similar to the little stint, Calidris minuta, with which they were once considered conspecific. The red-necked stint's small size, fine dark bill, dark legs and quicker movements distinguish this species from all waders except the other dark-legged stints. It can be distinguished from the western sandpiper and the semipalmated sandpiper in all plumages by its combination of a fine bill tip, unwebbed toes, and longer primary projection.

The breeding adult has an unstreaked orange breast, bordered with dark markings below, and a white V on its back. In winter plumage identification is difficult, although it is shorter legged and longer winged than the little stint. Juveniles have more contrasting mantle plumage and weaker white lines down the back than their relative. The call is a hoarse "stit".

Distribution and habitat
Red-necked stints are strongly migratory, breeding along the Arctic littoral of eastern Eurasia and spending the non-breeding season in South East Asia and Australasia as far south as Tasmania and New Zealand. They are rare vagrants to western Europe, with most records from Ireland. They are often seen in western Alaska and occasionally elsewhere in the Americas.

Behaviour
Red-necked stints are highly gregarious and will form flocks with other small Calidris waders, such as sharp-tailed sandpipers and curlew sandpipers in their non-breeding areas.

Breeding
Their breeding habitat is tundra. They nest on the ground and breed from spring to summer.

Diet
They forage in wet grassland and soft mud, mainly picking up food by sight. In their non-breeding habitat they feed on intertidal mudflats and along the muddy margins of freshwater lakes. They mainly eat insects and other small invertebrates.

References

Further reading

External links

 Selected red-necked stint images at Oriental Bird Images
 
 
 
 
 
 
 
 

red-necked stint
red-necked stint
Wading birds
Birds of North Asia
Native birds of Alaska
Birds of Southeast Asia
Birds of Oceania
red-necked stint
Articles containing video clips
Taxa named by Peter Simon Pallas